Teocuitatlán de Corona is a town and municipality, in Jalisco in central-western Mexico. The municipality covers an area of  409.98 km².

In 2005, the municipality had a total population of 10,226.

References

Municipalities of Jalisco